Virzì is an Italian surname. Notable people with the surname include:

 Carlo Virzì (born 1972), Italian composer, film director, and screenwriter  
 Paolo Virzì (born 1964), Italian film director, screenwriter, and producer

Italian-language surnames